Strophanthus caudatus is a woody liana that can grow up to  in length, with a trunk diameter of up to . It grows natively from Guangxi in southern China, through Indochina (including the Andaman and Nicobar Islands) to Malesia and New Guinea.

References

caudatus
Flora of Guangxi
Flora of Indo-China
Flora of Malesia
Flora of New Guinea
Plants described in 1767